Abdullah Mohammed Al-Qasabi (born 28 April 1986), commonly known as Abdullah Al-Qasabi, is an Omani footballer who plays for Fanja SC in Oman Professional League.

Club career statistics

International career
Abdullah was selected for the national team for the first time in 2012. He made his first appearance for Oman on 8 November 2012 in a friendly match against Estonia. He has represented the national team in the 2014 FIFA World Cup qualification.

Honours

Club
With Fanja
Oman Professional League (0): Runner-up 2012-13, 2013-14
Sultan Qaboos Cup (1): 2013-14
Oman Professional League Cup (1): 2014-15
Oman Super Cup (1): 2012, Runners-up 2013, 2014

References

External links
 
 
 Abdullah Al-Qasabi at Goal.com
 
 

1986 births
Living people
Omani footballers
Oman international footballers
Association football defenders
Fanja SC players
Oman Professional League players